Robert Meakin (born December 17, 1964) is a Canadian curler and curling coach.

Awards
Manitoba Sports Hall of Fame:
 inducted in 2002 with the 1995 Kerry Burtnyk team, Canadian and World champions
 inducted in 2000 with the 1988 Jeff Stoughton’s mixed team, Canadian mixed champions

Teams

Men's

Mixed

Record as a coach of national teams

Personal life
He is married and also has a son. He currently works as vice president, sales and marketing at Pride Electronics Inc.

References

External links
 
 Rob Meakin – Curling Canada Stats Archive
 Rob Meakin - CurlManitoba
 Video: 

Living people
1964 births
Curlers from Winnipeg
Canadian male curlers
World curling champions
Brier champions
Canadian mixed curling champions
Canadian curling coaches